Mästerskapsserien (Championship League)  was a short-lived Swedish football league played 1991 and 1992 to decide the Swedish Champions. The top six teams from Allsvenskan qualified for Mästerskapsserien while the four bottom had to play the promotion and relegation Kvalsvenskan league with four (1991) and two (1992) teams from Division 1.

Champions
The winners and runners-up of the two seasons were:

References

 
Defunct football competitions in Sweden
1991 establishments in Sweden
1992 disestablishments in Sweden